The 63rd Filipino Academy of Movie Arts and Sciences Awards Night was held at the Newport Performing Arts Theater inside the Resorts World Manila in Pasay on September 20, 2015 with the theme "Throwback Glam Day, A Look Back At Six Glorious Decades of Philippine Cinema". The awards night was hosted by Sam Concepcion and Coleen Garcia, it was aired on ABS-CBN's "Sunday's Best" at 11:30pm on September 27, 2015.

Awards

Major Awards
Winners are listed first and highlighted with boldface.

Special Awards

Iconic Movie Queens of Philippine Cinema
Gloria Romero
Susan Roces
Nora Aunor
Maricel Soriano
Dawn Zulueta
Sarah Geronimo
German Moreno Youth Achievement Award
Bianca Umali
Diego Loyzaga
Jasmine Curtis Smith
Kiko Estrada
Kim Rodriguez
Mark Neumann
Miguel Tanfelix
Nadine Lustre
Robi Domingo
Sofia Andres

Face of the Night
Richard Gutierrez
Toni Gonzaga

FAMAS Lifetime Achievement Award
Tito, Vic, and Joey
Fernando Poe Jr. Memorial Award
Coco Martin
Public Service Award
Julius Babao and Kaye Dacer of DZMM's Aksyon Ngayon
Dr. Jose Perez Memorial Award
Lhar Santiago
Arturo M. Padua Memorial Award
Emy Abuan
Film Critics Choice Award
Esoterika: Manila
FAMAS Presidential Award
Doctor Bong Ramirez

References

External links
FAMAS Awards 

FAMAS Award
FAM
FAM